Professor Julian Saul David (born 1966) is a British academic military historian and broadcaster. He is best known for his work on the Indian Rebellion of 1857 and the Anglo-Zulu War, as well as for presenting and appearing in documentaries on British television covering imperial and military themes.

Of Armenian ancestry through his father and originally named Davidian, David was born in Monmouth, Monmouthshire, Wales, and was educated at various local schools in Herefordshire and Monmouthshire before studying for his A-levels at Ampleforth College. He studied for an MA in history at Edinburgh University, for which he was awarded a upper-second class degree, and read for his PhD at the University of Glasgow. He was Visiting Professor of Military History at the University of Hull for 2007 – 2008. In 2009 he was appointed professor of Military History at the University of Buckingham and has since been directing the institution's MA programme.

David's books include The Indian Mutiny, which was shortlisted for the Duke of Westminster's Medal for Military Literature, Military Blunders, Zulu: the Heroism and Tragedy of the Zulu War of 1879 (a Waterstone's Military History Book of the Year) and Zulu and Victoria’s Wars. He has presented and appeared in a number of BBC programmes, including Zulu: The True Story, Time Commanders, The Greatest Knight (2008) and Bullets, Boots and Bandages: How to really win at war (2012).

Bibliography

Non fiction

Fiction

References

External links
 Saul David's web page

1966 births
British television presenters
Living people
People educated at Ampleforth College
People from Monmouth, Wales
British military historians
Date of birth missing (living people)
Alumni of the University of Edinburgh
Alumni of the University of Glasgow
Academics of the University of Buckingham
British people of Armenian descent